The View Is Worth the Climb is the ninth studio album by New Zealand singer/songwriter Tim Finn, released in August 2011. The album peaked at number 28 in New Zealand.

The title track was co-written by Finn with Australian singer-songwriter Megan Washington. Three other tracks are co-written by Finn and his wife Marie Azcona.

The album was recorded in twelve working days in late 2010 at Roundhead Studios in Auckland, New Zealand.

The song "Wild Sweet Children" features Finn's children Harper and Elliot Finn on backing vocals.

Track listing

Personnel
Tim Finn – vocals, acoustic guitar, banana drum
Brett Adams – electric guitar
Joey Waronker – drums
Zac Rae – keyboards
Tony Buchen – bass
Mara TK
Harper Finn – vocals
Eliot Finn – vocals

Charts

References 

Tim Finn albums
2011 albums